The Women's United States Squash Open 2012 is the women's edition of the 2012 United States Open (squash), which is a WSA World Series event Gold (prize money: $70 000). The event took place at the Daskalakis Athletic Center in Philadelphia, Pennsylvania in the United States from the 7th of October to the 12 October. Nicol David won her first US Open trophy, beating Raneem El Weleily in the final.

Prize money and ranking points
For 2012, the prize purse was $70,000. The prize money and points breakdown is as follows:

Seeds

Draw and results

See also
United States Open (squash)
WSA World Series 2012
Men's United States Open (squash) 2012

References

External links
WSA US Open 2012 website
US Squash Open official website
WISPA US Open 2012 website
Squasinfo US Squash Open website

Squash tournaments in the United States
Women's US Open
Women's US Open
2012 in American sports
2012 in women's squash
Squash in Pennsylvania